"I Finally Found My Way" is a song by the American hard rock band Kiss released on their 1998 album Psycho Circus.

A ballad credited to guitarist/vocalist Paul Stanley and producer Bob Ezrin, the song was written specifically for drummer Peter Criss to sing for the album. Although Criss is featured as the lead vocalist on the track, he did not perform the drums on it. The only song on the album that he played drums on was Ace Frehley's "Into the Void".

The track was released as a promotional single, but not as a commercial single for the album.

The song was never played live by the band, as the band kept Criss' signature song "Beth" in their concert setlist instead.

Personnel
Peter Criss – lead vocals
Paul Stanley – acoustic guitar, bass guitar, backing vocals
Kevin Valentine – drums
Bob Ezrin – Fender Rhodes electric piano
Shelly Berg – acoustic piano, orchestration, conductor

References

Kiss (band) songs
1998 singles
Songs written by Bob Ezrin
Songs written by Paul Stanley
Song recordings produced by Bruce Fairbairn
1990s ballads